Atlanticopristis (meaning "Atlantic saw") is an extinct genus of sclerorhynchid (a sawfish-like chondrichthyan) that lived during the Middle Cretaceous (Cenomanian) of what is now the Northeast Region of Brazil, between 100.5 and 93.9 million years ago. Fourteen fossil teeth from Atlanticopristis were found in the Alcântara Formation, and referred to the closely related Onchopristis in 2007; a redescription in 2008 by Brazilian paleontologists Manuel Medeiros and Agostinha Pereira assigned it to a new genus containing one species, Atlanticopristis equatorialis.

Like all sawfish, it would have had a long snout armed with modified fish scales shaped into "teeth", but Atlanticopristis's teeth had barbs on both sides. Atlanticopristis inhabited fresh to brackish water estuaries near large conifer forests, and lived in the same time and place as many species of bony fish, cartilaginous fish, and lobe finned fish, as well as some crocodilians, and several dinosaurs. Many of the taxa present in the Alcântara Formation are also known from the Middle Cretaceous Kem Kem Beds in Morocco, due to the past connection of South America and Africa into the supercontinent Gondwana.

Description 

The teeth on the rostrum (snout) of Atlanticopristis have a varied number of barbs at the front and rear margins. They are also laterally compressed, with both sides displaying thin enamel ridges extending outward from the base of the tooth, forming a fan shape. Some of the teeth also have grooves running down their length on both sides. The peduncle (or base) of the tooth is enlarged, and covered in irregular ridges, the bottom is typically concave, having a sub-rectangular or ellipsoid shape.

The specimens range in size from 11.5 mm (0.45 inches) to 18.8 mm (0.74 inches). The holotype (CPHNAMA-VT 1174) is 15 mm (0.59 inches) in length, including the peduncle; which itself is 6.3 mm (0.24 inches) wide, and 3 mm (0.11 inches) long. It has a thickness of 3 mm (0.11 inches). The barb number on all specimens ranges from two to four barbs at the front margin and four to five at the rear, some specimens like CPHNAMA-VT 1085 having vestigial bumps that could be considered additional barbs.

Sawfish evolved long snouts armed with rows of teeth on both sides, although these spines do not represent true teeth, but highly modified fish scales, or dermal denticles. This adaptation could be related to their feeding habits, such as sifting through sand/mud to search for food or to slash at prey. Like extant sawsharks, these spines were attached to the rostrum of sclerorhynchids like Atlanticopristis using ligaments, compared to modern sawfish which have their teeth attached via alveoli (tooth sockets). The longitudinal ribbing, or ridges, of enameloid that can be seen on sclerorhynchid teeth would have aided in the attachment of these ligaments.

Discovery and naming 
Fossils of Atlanticopristis were discovered in the Maranhão state of northeastern Brazil, at the Alcântara Formation of the Itapecuru Group on Cajual Island. The formation, composed of Cretaceous sediments, outcrops at the coastline of the Sao Marcos Bay, and documents the separation of South America and Africa; while presenting a large quantity and variety of continental and marine vertebrates. Fossils from the Alcântara Formation are highly diverse and plentiful, yet often fragmentary. Fourteen rostral teeth from Atlanticopriostis were brought back from the Falésia do Sismito exposure; due to the fact that sawfish are made of cartilage, their skeletons do not fossilize easily, so most remains found consist of the teeth from their snouts. The specimens of Atlanticopristis are currently housed at the Centro de Pesquisa de História Natural e Arqueologia do Maranhão (Archaeology and Natural History Research Center of Maranhão), in São Luís.

The holotype tooth (CPHNAMA-VT 1174) was designated as such for being the most complete and well preserved specimen. Additionally, several specimens were assigned as paratypes: CPHNAMA-VT 1086, a single tooth and the largest specimen; CPHNAMA-VT 1085, two complete teeth; CPHNAMA-VT 1088 and CPHNAMA-VT 1173, two groups of four incomplete teeth each, all missing the tip of the crown; and CPHNAMA-VT 1173, two partial specimens with most of the crown.

Portuguese paleontologists Manuel Medeiros and Agostinha Pereira described the material in 2008. The genus contains one species, Atlanticopristis equatorialis. The generic name referring to the Atlantic Ocean, in which most sediments of the Alcântara Formation were deposited, and "pristis" being the Greek word for "saw". The specific name "equatorialis" was chosen due to the discovery site being in close proximity to the equator.

Classification 

Atlanticopristis belongs to the Sclerorhynchidae, a possibly monophyletic family of Cretaceous sawfish-like chondrichthyans dating from the Early to Late epochs of the Cretaceous Period. The fossilized teeth of Atlanticopristis had previously been referred to an indeterminate species of Onchopristis in 2007 by Pereira and Medeiros, based on the shape of the peduncle, the presence of multiple barbs, and the enamel ribbing. In 2008 the teeth were assigned to a new genus based on the lack of an intermediate form between Atlanticopristis and Onchopristis, as well as morphological differences that distinguish it from other sclerorhynchids. Pereira and Medeiros also stated that Atlanticopristis is so closely related to Onchopristis that, "any other subjective interpretation could consider them as synonyms." The barb number on the spines of Atlanticopristis more closely resembles that of Onchopristis dunklei than Onchopristis numidus, as O. numidus usually has no more than a single barb, while O. dunklei always has more than one. The sclerorhynchid Borodinopristis, also has multibarbed teeth, but is too distinct in all other aspects to suggest a close relation.

The formation of multiple barbs on both sides of the teeth is a characteristic also seen in the extant Australian sawshark Ikamauius. In general, sclerorynchids all developed dentition closer to that of sawsharks than modern sawfish, but they are more closely related to the latter. This similarity is considered a case of convergent evolution, where unrelated organisms evolve analogous traits.

Atlanticopristis and Onchopristis exhibit similarities to a Bolivian species of sclerorhynchid Pucapristis branisi, such as the enamel ribbing and the formation of a barb on the posterior margin, however, their peduncles differ greatly. In 1987, French paleoichthyologist Henri Cappeta distinguished two groups inside of sclerorhynchidae, separating Onchopristis from Pucapristis.

Paleoecology 

Atlanticopristis originates from the Alcântara Formation, which is dated to the Cenomanian stage of the Middle Cretaceous Period, sometime between 100.5 and 93.9 million years ago. Like most modern sawfishes, it inhabited an estuarine environment of fresh to brackish water. Atlanticopristis likely came from the shallow marine regions of the southern Atlantic Ocean, and periodically entered estuarine waters. The area that is now Laje do Coringa locality would have comprised tidal estuaries of rivers and lagoons, alongside these would have been large forests of conifers, horsetails, and ferns. The animal would have shared its habitat with freshwater, marine, and estuarine fish like the closely related sclerorynchid Onchopristis numidus; Mawsonia gigas, a large coelacanth; Myliobatis sp. (of uncertain species), a ray; as well as many species of bony fishes, ray-finned fishes, and lungfish. Marine invertebrates were prominent in the region, as shown by the many mollusc genera discovered in the deposits. Atlanticopristis remains have also been found in association with those of land-based animals like crocodilians and dinosaurs, among these are two members of Spinosauridae (a family of crocodile-like dinosaurs); Oxalaia quilombensis, and Spinosaurus sp. An indeterminate Carcharodontosaurus species is known from the deposits, along with other small-to-medium-sized theropods, and the mesoeucrocodylian Coringasuchus anisodontis.

The paleoecological situation in Cenomanian Brazil highly resembles that of Middle Cretaceous north Africa, particularly the Kem Kem and Bahariya Formations; many of the same biota can be found in both north Africa and northeastern Brazil. This is a result of Gondwana, a supercontinent that comprised Africa and South America, after their separation, the taxa on each landmass would have continued to evolve separately; contributing to small anatomical differences between the transoceanic taxa.

References 

Sclerorhynchidae
Prehistoric cartilaginous fish genera
Cretaceous cartilaginous fish
Cenomanian life
Prehistoric fish of South America
Late Cretaceous animals of South America
Cretaceous Brazil
Fossils of Brazil
Fossil taxa described in 2008